The 2019–20 Biathlon World Cup – Sprint Men started on 1 December 2019 in Östersund and was finished on 12 March 2020 in Kontiolahti.

Competition format
The  sprint race is the third oldest biathlon event; the distance is skied over three laps. The biathlete shoots two times at any shooting lane, first prone, then standing, totalling 10 targets. Competitors' starts are staggered, normally by 30 seconds.

2018–19 Top 3 standings

Medal winners

Standings

Notes

References

Sprint Men